The 1953–54 Eintracht Frankfurt season was the 54th season in the club's football history. In 1953–54 the club played in the Oberliga Süd, the top tier of German football. It was the club's 9th season in the Oberliga Süd.

The season ended up with Eintracht finishing in the Oberliga Süd as runners-up. In the German championship round the Eagles didn't qualify for the final match.

Matches

Legend

Friendlies

Oberliga

League table

Results summary

Results by round

League fixtures and results

Championship round

Squad

Squad and statistics

|}

Transfers

In:

Out:

See also
 1954 German football championship

Notes

Sources

External links
 Official English Eintracht website 
 German archive site
 1953–54 Oberliga Süd season at Fussballdaten.de 

1953-54
German football clubs 1953–54 season